Murmastiene parish is an administrative unit of Varakļāni Municipality, Latvia.

Towns, villages and settlements of Murmastiene parish 

Parishes of Latvia
Varakļāni Municipality